The high diving  portion of the 2013 World Aquatics Championships was held from 29–31 July 2013 at the Port Vell in Barcelona, Spain.

Events
The men's competition was contested in five, the women's competition in three rounds.

Schedule

Medal summary

Medal table
 Host nation

Medal events

References

External links
Official website

 
High Diving
2013
World Aquatics Championships
Diving competitions in Spain
2013 in Spanish sport